La parodia is a Mexican parody television series produced by Televisa for the Canal de las Estrellas network. The cast originally included Arath de la Torre  Angélica Vale  and Gisella Aboumrad.  After Vale left the show to star in La Fea Más Bella, Roxana Castellanos took her place as the female parodist. The series parodied many telenovelas, films, and pop-culture themes of Mexico.

External links

Mexican sketch comedy television series
Las Estrellas original programming
2002 Mexican television series debuts
Television series by Televisa
Spanish-language television shows
Parody television series